The Manilla railway underbridges are two heritage-listed railway bridges located on the Tamworth-Barraba railway line in the town of Manilla in the Tamworth Regional Council local government area of New South Wales, Australia. The underbridges are owned by RailCorp, an agency of the Government of New South Wales. The two sites were added to the New South Wales State Heritage Register on 2 April 1999.

Description 
The bridges includes two structures, one located at Upper Manilla across the Borah Creek; and the other across the Oakey Creek.

Bora Creek underbridge 
The bridge is seven spans in length, with the three central spans constructed with  span Howe-Deck timber trusses. The trestles are supported on concrete sills. Opened in 1908, it has three  timber truss spans and is a good example of the  deck Howe truss. This type of truss bridge was introduced in 1902 and used until 1908. The bridge is of considerable technological significance. The bridge carries a single-track  railway on an open deck (with transoms). The trusses are deck-type Howe trusses of the  deck-type, with timber compression diagonals, steel tie rods for the verticals and five bays. The piers are timber, with concrete bases. The bridge was listed on the (now defunct) Register of the National Estate on 18 April 1989.

Oakey Creek underbridge 
The bridge is a significant technical accomplishment. It was opened in 1908 and has five  timber truss spans. It is a good example of the  deck type Howe truss, introduced in 1902 and used until 1908. The bridge carries a single-track  railway on an open deck (with transomes). The trusses are deck type Howe trusses, of the  deck type, with five bays, timber compression diagonals and steel tie rods for the verticals. The piers are timber. The bridge was listed on the (now defunct) Register of the National Estate on 18 April 1989.

Heritage listing 
The bridges were constructed in timber because of the remote location and constraints on cost, particularly related to branch line construction. They are two of the relatively few surviving timber bridges left in the State and are of considerable significance.

The Manilla railway underbridges were listed on the New South Wales State Heritage Register on 2 April 1999 having satisfied the following criteria.

The place possesses uncommon, rare or endangered aspects of the cultural or natural history of New South Wales.

This item is assessed as historically rare. This item is assessed as scientifically rare. This item is assessed as archaeologically rare. This item is assessed as socially rare.

See also 

 Barraba railway line
 William Howe (architect)

References

Attribution

Bibliography 
 
 
 

New South Wales State Heritage Register
Tamworth Regional Council
Railway bridges in New South Wales
Articles incorporating text from the New South Wales State Heritage Register
1908 establishments in Australia
Bridges completed in 1908
Truss bridges in Australia
Wooden bridges in Australia
Howe truss bridges
New South Wales places listed on the defunct Register of the National Estate